Frederic Lansing Day was an American playwright b. September 28, 1890 in Newton, Massachusetts d. 1981 in Wilton, New Hampshire. Frederic Day, the son of Henry Brown Day, the founder of the Day Trust Company, was a Socialist and Unitarian. He graduated from Yale in 1912 and married Katharine Munroe (b. 1891 d. 1956) whom he later divorced. They had a home built in Cambridge, Massachusetts in 1920. He later remarried to Frances Palfrey (b.1909 d. 2004). Frederic Day worked briefly as a journalist and as an employee in his father's bank. He published at least four plays: The Makers of Light: A Play in Three Parts (1925) originally produced by The 47 Workshop of Harvard and published by Brentano's, The Slump (1920), also produced by The 47 Workshop, Heaven is Deep, and The fall of the house of Usher: a dramatization in seven scenes of Edgar Allan Poe's short story.

Makers of Light
Makers of Light is a drama copyrighted by Day in 1920 and published in 1925. It was first shown at the Agassiz House Theater in Cambridge Nov. 25, 1921. The cast consisted of F.C. Packard, Jr., Angela Morris, Edith Coburn Noyes, Dorothy Sands, Oviatt McConnell, Henry Carlton, James Daly, F.L. Strong, Norman Clark, E.P. Goodnow and Robert Bushnell. It opened at the Neighborhood Playhouse of New York City, the Little Theater of Cleveland and the Play House of Cleveland.

"Makers of Light, when originally produced by the 47 Workshop made so deep an impression that later it was played at the Neighborhood Playhouse, New York City. Here it was again praised for its sincerity, subtle characterization of the chief figures and its power. Given at the Little Theater, Clevland, in the winter of 1924, it was revived the following autumn." -Professor George P. Barker
The dedication to the Makers of Light reads, "To my father; For his affection in spite of disapproval, his loyalty in spite of disbelief."

External links 
Small-Cast One-Act Guide Online
Internet Broadway Database: Makers of Light
Cambridge Buildings and Architects  (information on residency in Cambridge)
New York Times Review: May 24, 1922 
New York Times: May 21, 1922
Munroe, Katherine Langdon, 1891-1956

1886 births
1982 deaths
Yale University alumni
20th-century American dramatists and playwrights